UTC+12:45 is an identifier for a time offset from UTC of +12:45.

As standard time (Southern Hemisphere winter)
Principal settlement: Waitangi

Oceania
New Zealand – Chatham Standard Time
Chatham Islands
Pitt Islands
South East Island
The Fort
Little Mangere Island
Star Keys
The Sisters
Forty-Fours

References

See also
Chatham Standard Time Zone
Time in New Zealand

UTC offsets
Time in New Zealand